Ivar (also Romanized as Īvar; also known as Avar and Ewar) is a village in Barkuh Rural District,  Kuhsorkh County, Razavi Khorasan Province, Iran. At the 2006 census, its population was 2,627, in 668 families.

References

External links

Populated places in Kuhsorkh County